The Central Anatolia Region (Turkish: Orta Anadolu Bölgesi) (TR7) is a statistical region in Turkey.

Subregions and provinces 

 Kırıkkale Subregion (TR71)
 Kırıkkale Province (TR711)
 Aksaray Province (TR712)
 Niğde Province (TR713)
 Nevşehir Province (TR714)
 Kırşehir Province (TR715)
 Kayseri Subregion (TR72)
 Kayseri Province (TR721)
 Sivas Province (TR722)
 Yozgat Province (TR723)

Age groups

Internal immigration

State register location of Central Anatolia residents

Marital status of 15+ population by gender

Education status of 15+ population by gender

See also 

 NUTS of Turkey

References

External links 
 TURKSTAT

Sources 
 ESPON Database

Statistical regions of Turkey